IMPS College of Engineering and Technology (or Impscet) is an engineering and management college located in Malda, West Bengal, India. The college was established in 2003. It provides engineering, technological and management education. The college is an AICTE-approved institution and is affiliated to the West Bengal University of Technology.

Organisation and administration

Governance
Members of Governing Body
 Mr. B. Bhattacharjee, Chairman,
 Dr. B.P. Sarkar, Director,
 Dr. Nemailal Tarafder, Principal,
 Mr A. Chakrabarty, Administrative Officer,
 Eastern Regional Officer, AICTE- Regional Officer, Kolkata,
 Superintendent Engineer, WBSEB, Malda,
 Vice-Chancellor or nominee, WBUT, Kolkata, West Bengal,
 Dr. Sajal Dasgupta, Director of Technical Education, Higher Education Dept., Government of West Bengal,
 Vice-Chancellor or nominee BIT, Mesra.

Academics

Courses offered

Undergraduate programme
Bachelor of Engineering (B.Tech)
 Civil engineering-120
 Electronics and Communication Engineering-60
 Electrical Engineering-60
 Computer Sciences Engineering-60

Library
The library has a collection of books and journals in the area of Electronics, Computer Science, Information Technology and related subjects like Physics, Chemistry and Mathematics. The library is housed on a complete floor with reading, reference and borrowing sections. The library has 6500 volumes of books and national and international journals. The library also provides a reach collection of all prominent newspapers and magazines.

Soft Skill Development Facilities
The approach of the Training and Placement Department is multi-fold:
 Train or provide exposure to students in specific software.
 Identify potential employers, 
 Approach and convince them to interview and select the students of the college.
 Training the teaching faculty to enhance their teaching capabilities.

Laboratories
The labs are:
 Computer Science Lab
 Electronics & Communication Lab
 Electrical Lab
 Information Technology Lab

Student life

Competitions
 IMPSCET participated in a Robotics competition and won the 3rd prize all over the West Bengal (2007)

Hostels
To provide boarding and lodging facilities, the college possess a boy's hostel and a separate girl's hostel. The accommodation capacity of boys and girls are 600 and 225 respectively. Facilities in the hostels include kitchens, safe drinking water, dining halls, a separate faculty room, mess and reading room. Hostel rooms have attached bath and toilet.

College events
Apart from academic events, the college calendar has twor major events:

 The Freshers Welcome is organized to introduce first year students to college life. The freshers welcome titled CORONATION has seen students' performances.
 Annual Cultural Fest

References
 Official website of IMPS Corps (www.impscet.net )
 Official email website of IMPS Corps (www.impscet.in )

External links
 IMPS Engineering College Official website

Educational institutions established in 2003
Colleges affiliated to West Bengal University of Technology
Education in Malda district
Universities and colleges in Malda district
2003 establishments in West Bengal